William Asa Finley (1839–1912) was an American academic and the first president of Corvallis College, known today as Oregon State University.

Born in Missouri in 1839, Finley moved to California in 1852. He went to California Wesleyan College in Santa Clara for three years and Pacific Methodist College for one year, where he received the degree of Artium Magister. Thereafter, he received the honorary Doctor of Divinity from Wofford College in Spartanburg, South Carolina in 1871.

In 1865, Finley became the first president of Corvallis College by the appointment of the Methodist Episcopal Church, South. His presidency there lasted until he resigned in June 1872 because of the health problems of his wife, Sarah Elizabeth Latimer. After Finley moved back to Santa Rosa, California with his wife, he became the second president of Pacific Methodist College in 1876; later, he became a president of Santa Rosa Young Ladies College.

William Asa Finley was the grandson of both Missouri state legislator Asa Finley and of California Pioneer William M. Campbell I, whose son co-founded the city of Campbell, California.

Legacies

Finley's contribution to Oregon State University was significant in that during his presidency, Corvallis College reached the status of an independent institution of higher education.

William L. Finley National Wildlife Refuge was named for Finley's nephew, conservationist William L. Finley.

Finley Hall on the OSU/Oregon State Campus was named for him.

References 

Oregon State University faculty
Presidents of Oregon State University
1839 births
1912 deaths
University of the Pacific (United States) alumni
Wofford College alumni